The 2016 Rochford District Council election took place on 5 May 2016 to elect members of Rochford District Council in England. Due to boundary changes, all seats on the council are up for election at the same time, with each ward electing three Councillors. This was on the same day as other local elections.

Results Summary

Ward Results

Downhall & Rawreth

Foulness & The Wakerings

Hawkwell East

Hawkwell West

 
 
 

No UKIP candidate as previous (-17.2).

Hockley

Hockley & Ashingdon

Hullbridge

 
 

No Independent candidate as previous (-7.6).

Lodge

Roche North & Rural

Roche South

Sweyne Park & Grange

Trinity

Wheatley

 
 
 

* Independent candidate stood under the description 'Rayleigh Independents'.

References

2016 English local elections
2016
2010s in Essex